"One Kiss from Heaven" is the fifth and final single released from English singer Louise's debut album, Naked (1996). Released on 18 November 1996, it reached number nine on the UK Singles Chart the same month.

Critical reception
Jon O'Brien from AllMusic noted "the sultry chill-out pop" of "One Kiss from Heaven". A reviewer from Music Week rated the song three out of five, stating that her "impressive solo track record will no doubt continue with this fifth single from Naked. It is her most sophisticated offering yet, but lacks the simple charm of its predecessors." In his album review, Mark Sutherland from NME described it as a "soppy smoocher".

Track listings
 UK CD1
 "One Kiss from Heaven" (remix)
 "One Kiss from Louise" (pop megamix)
 "One Kiss from Heaven" (Boot 'n' Mac club mix)
 "One Kiss from Heaven" (Boot 'n' Mac dub mix)

 UK CD2
 "One Kiss from Heaven" (remix)
 "Naked" (Tony De Vit mix)
 "One Kiss from Louise" (club megamix)

 UK cassette single
 "One Kiss from Heaven" (remix)
 "One Kiss from Louise" (pop megamix)

Charts

References

Songs about kissing
Louise Redknapp songs
1996 singles
1996 songs
EMI Records singles
First Avenue Records singles
Songs written by Denis Ingoldsby
Songs written by Oliver Smallman
Songs written by Simon Climie